The Isle of Man competed at the 2022 Commonwealth Games in Birmingham, England between 28 July and 8 August 2022. Having made its Games debut in 1958, it was the Isle of Man's seventeenth appearance at the Games.

Cyclist Mark Cavendish and swimmer Laura Kinley were the country's flagbearers during the opening ceremony.

The Games marked the first time since 2002 that the Isle of Man failed to win any medals.

Competitors
The following is the list of number of competitors participating at the Games per sport/discipline.

Athletics

Two athletes were selected on 14 September 2021; a further two were added on 25 January 2022 and three more on 5 May 2022.

Men
Track and road events

Field events

Women
Track and road events

Badminton

One player was selected on 3 May 2022.
 
Singles

Boxing

Two boxers were selected on 3 May 2022.

Cycling

Eight cyclists were selected on 14 September 2021; a further three were added on 25 January 2022 and two more on 5 May 2022.

Road
Men

Women

Track
Scratch race

Gymnastics

One gymnast was selected on 25 January 2022.

Artistic
Women
Individual Qualification

Individual Finals

Para powerlifting

One powerlifter was selected on 3 May 2022.

Swimming

Two swimmers were selected on 14 September 2021; a further two were added on 25 January 2022 and two more on 5 May 2022.

A seventh swimmer was added on 22 June 2022.

Men

Women

Mixed

Triathlon

One triathlete was selected on 25 January 2022, followed by a second on 2 June 2022.

Individual

References

External links
Commonwealth Games Isle of Man Official site

Nations at the 2022 Commonwealth Games
Isle of Man at the Commonwealth Games
2022 in Manx sport